Warren Township is a civil township of Midland County in the U.S. state of Michigan. The population was 2,107 at the 2000 census. The township surrounds the city of Coleman, but the two are administered autonomously.

Geography

Demographics
As of the census of 2000, there were 2,107 people, 769 households, and 606 families residing in the township. There were 819 housing units at an average density of 23.4 per square mile (9.0/km). The racial makeup of the township was 97.91% White, 0.28% Native American, 0.19% Asian, 0.09% Pacific Islander, 0.19% from other races, and 1.33% from two or more races. Hispanic or Latino of any race were 0.76% of the population.

There were 769 households, out of which 36.3% had children under the age of 18 living with them, 69.1% were married couples living together, 6.4% had a female householder with no husband present, and 21.1% were non-families. 17.6% of all households were made up of individuals, and 8.5% had someone living alone who was 65 years of age or older.  The average household size was 2.73 and the average family size was 3.09.

In the township the population was spread out, with 27.4% under the age of 18, 8.0% from 18 to 24, 28.3% from 25 to 44, 23.7% from 45 to 64, and 12.5% who were 65 years of age or older.  The median age was 36 years. For every 100 females, there were 103.2 males.  For every 100 females age 18 and over, there were 97.5 males.

The median income for a household in the township was $40,063, and the median income for a family was $47,014. Males had a median income of $35,677 versus $23,555 for females. The per capita income for the township was $16,928.  About 6.4% of families and 9.0% of the population were below the poverty line, including 7.8% of those under age 18 and 18.4% of those age 65 or over.

References

Townships in Midland County, Michigan
Townships in Michigan